Jürg Peter Buser, known as Peter Buser, (born 27 February 1946 in Basel) is a Swiss mathematician, specializing in differential geometry and global analysis.

Education and career
Buser received his doctorate in 1976 from the University of Basel with advisor Heinz Huber and thesis Untersuchungen über den ersten Eigenwert des Laplaceoperators auf kompakten Flächen (Studies on the first eigenvalue of the Laplace operator on compact surfaces). As a post-doctoral student he was at the University of Bonn, the University of Minnesota. and the State University of New York at Stony Brook, before he habilitated at the University of Bonn with a thesis on the length spectrum of Riemann surfaces.

Buser is known for his construction of curved isospectral surfaces (published in 1986 and 1988). His 1988 construction led to a negative solution to Mark Kac's famous 1966 problem Can one hear the shape of a drum?. The negative solution was published in 1992 by Scott Wolpert, David Webb and Carolyn S. Gordon. The  is named after him and Jeff Cheeger.

He has been a professor at the École Polytechnique Fédérale de Lausanne (EPFL) since 1982. From 2004 to 2005 he was president of the Swiss Mathematical Society. In 2003 he was made an honorary doctor of the University of Helsinki.

Selected publications
 
 
 with Hermann Karcher: 
 with Hermann Karcher: Gromov`s almost flat manifolds, Astérisque 1981, Nr. 81, p. 148
 "A note on the isoperimetric constant." In Annales scientifiques de l'École Normale Supérieure, vol. 15, no. 2, 1982, pp. 213-230.
 "On the bipartition of graphs." Discrete Applied Mathematics 9, no. 1 (1984): 105–109.
 Isospectral Riemann Surfaces, Annales Institut Fourier (Grenoble), vol. 36, 1986, pp. 167–192
 Cayley graphs and planar isospectral domains, in Toshikazu Sunada (ed.), Geometry and Analysis on Manifolds, Springer Verlag, Lecture Notes in Mathematics, vol. 1339, 1988, pp. 64–77 
 Geometry and Spectra of Compact Riemann Surfaces, Birkhäuser 1992; 2010 pbk reprint
 with John Horton Conway, Peter Doyle, and Klaus-Dieter Semmler: 
 with Peter Sarnak: 
 with Mika Seppälä:

References

External links
 Homepage at EPFL

Swiss mathematicians
Differential geometers
University of Basel alumni
University of Bonn alumni
Academic staff of the École Polytechnique Fédérale de Lausanne
1946 births
Living people